Il professor Cenerentolo is a 2015 Italian comedy film written, directed and performed by Leonardo Pieraccioni. The scenes of the film were shot in Lazio, between Rome, Formia, Gaeta and Ventotene. It was Pieraccioni's first film not being set in his homeland of Tuscany. The cast also includes Laura Chiatti, Massimo Ceccherini and Flavio Insinna.

Plot
Umberto Massaciuccoli is an engineer who attempted a bank robbery to avoid the bankruptcy of his business; the robbery, however, fails miserably and Umberto is thus arrested and sentenced to a period of detention in the Ventotene prison. When his term approaches the end, the man is given permission to work part-time outside the penitentiary. He is employed in a library and also tutors the prison director's daughter, who should soon graduate.

One evening, during a socio-cultural event open to the public, Umberto meets Morgana, a fascinating dance teacher. Umberto's nickname "professor" among the other inmates makes the girl believe that he is there as an educator, not a prisoner. Taking advantage of the misunderstanding, Umberto begins to date her during the time actually assigned for his job in the library. He must always return to jail by midnight though.

One day Morgana discovers the truth and breaks off from the dishonest Umberto. Thanks to the help and complicity of various friends and companions, he manages to restore the relationship, by recovering in particular a gold necklace handed down for generations within her family as a heirloom, which a previous and violent ex boyfriend had stolen and sold. Morgana, reflecting on Umberto's questions about the love of a daughter for her father, decides to gift part of the jewel to Umberto's daughter Martina, leaving the latter in the dark about her. Some time later Umberto, Morgana and Arnaldo, owner of the municipal library where Umberto had been employed, start a business that deals with recovering missing objects, thanks to Arnaldo's dwarfism and ability to dig within small crevices.

Cast
Leonardo Pieraccioni as Umberto Massaciuccoli
Laura Chiatti as Morgana
Massimo Ceccherini as Tinto
Flavio Insinna as the prison director
Davide Marotta as Arnaldo
Lisa Ruth Andreozzi as Martina
Sergio Friscia as Don Vincenzo
Nicola Nocella as officer Nocella
Nicola Acunzo as Calabrese
Lorena Cesarini as Sveva
Manuela Zero as Mia
Emanuela Aurizi as the spouse
Lucianna De Falco as Signora Mammolotti

Release
The film was released in cinemas starting from 7 December 2015, distributed by 01 Distribution in collaboration with Rai Cinema.

Reception

Receipts
The film on its debut weekend grossed over 1,250,000 euros, placing itself in 1st place in the Italian box office, surpassing even Chiamatemi Francesco. After a week, as of December 15 2015 the film held the top spot reaching a total of €2,975,950. With the arrival in the theaters of Star Wars: The Force Awakens the movie dropped to second position, and then dropped to sixth position at the end of December, behind Natale col Boss and Vacanze ai Caraibi. As of January 6 2016 the film has grossed  euro, ranking in third place of the most viewed Italian films of the holidays.

References

External links

2015 films
Films directed by Leonardo Pieraccioni
2010s Italian-language films
2015 comedy films
Italian comedy films